Khurian (also Romanized as Khūrīān and Khowryān; also known as Kharīān) is a village in Dehmolla Rural District, in the Central District of Shahrud County, Semnan Province, Iran. At the 2006 census, its population was 93, in 37 families.

References 

Populated places in Shahrud County